Brendesha Marie Tynes is an American psychologist who is a professor of Psychology and Education at the USC Rossier School of Education. Her research considers how young people engage with social media, and how this influences their socioeconomic and academic outcomes. Tynes is principal investigator on the Teen Life Online and in Schools Project, which studies race-related cyberbullying.

Early life and education 
Tynes is from Detroit. Her mother worked for Chrysler. She completed her bachelor's degree in history at Columbia University, then moved to Northwestern University for her graduate studies, where she specialised in learning sciences. Tynes was a graduate student at University of California, Los Angeles, studying the relationship between youth identity and the internet. She was a researcher in the laboratory of Patricia Greenfield, who was investigating the construction of sexual identity online. Tynes has said that her research was inspired by the Kenneth and Mamie Clark. After graduating, Tynes worked as a high school global studies teacher.

Research and career 
Tynes studies youth engagement with social media, and how this impacts their academic outcomes. She was the first to identify that adolescents of color were most likely to suffer from online victimization. This victimization can result in increased depressive tendencies and decreased academic motivation. Working with the National Institutes of Health, Tynes studied race-related cyberbullying. Through the development of a risk and resilience framework, Tynes has shown that whilst online interactions can threaten the social identify of adolescents, there are strategies to mitigate this.

Based on her research, Tynes developed a mobile-driven application that helps young people cope with online racial discrimination. The application was evaluated using a randomized control trial. Tynes was the founder of the Digital Equity Project, an investigation into the use of mobile devices in K–12 schools. She showed that the regular exposure to traumatic incidents that involved people of color online can result in poor mental health outcomes.

Tyne joined the University of Michigan as a Visiting associate professor in 2015.

Awards and honors 

 2010 Diverse Magazine Emerging Scholars under 40
 2012 AERA Early Career Contribution Award
 2015 Spencer Foundation Midcareer Award
 2015 American Educational Research Association Early Career Award
 2022 AERA Fellow

Selected publications 
 
 
 
 Tynes, B. M., Rose, C.,  & Williams, D. (2010) The development and validation of the Online Victimization Scale for adolescents. Cyberpsychology: Journal of Psychosocial Research on Cyberspace, 4(2).
 Tynes, B. M., Garcia, E., Giang, M., & Coleman, N. (2011). The racial landscape of social network sites: Forging identity, community & civic engagement. I/S: A Journal of Law and Policy for the Information Society.
 Tynes, B. M., Umaña-Taylor, A., Rose, C., Lin, J., & Anderson, C. (2012). Online racial discrimination and the protective function of ethnic identity and self-esteem for African Americans. Developmental Psychology, 48, 342 – 355.https://doi.org/10.1037/a0027032
 Tynes, B. M., Rose, C., & Markoe, S. (2013). Extending campus life to the internet: Social media, discrimination and perceptions of racial climate. Journal of Diversity in Higher Education.
 Tynes, B. M. & Mitchell, K. (2013). Black youth beyond the digital divide: Age and gender differences in internet use, communication patterns and victimization experiences. Journal of Black Psychology.
 Tynes, B. M., Hiss, S., Rose, C., Umaña -Taylor, A., Mitchell, K. & Williams, D.  (2014). Internet use, online racial discrimination, and adjustment among a diverse, school- based sample of adolescents.  International Journal of Gaming & Computer Mediated Simulations, 6 (3), 1–16.
 Michikyan, M., Lozada, F., Weidenbenner, J.V.& Tynes, B. M. (2014). Adolescent coping strategies in the face of their “worst online experience”. International Journal of Gaming & Computer Mediated Simulations, 6(4), 1–16.
 Umaña-Taylor, A. J., Tynes, B. M., Toomey, R. B., Williams, D., & Mitchell, K. (2015). Latino adolescents’ perceived discrimination in online and off-line settings: An examination of cultural risk and protective factors. Developmental Psychology, 51(1), 87–100.
 Rose, C. A. & Tynes, B. M. (2015). Longitudinal associations between cybervictimization and mental health among US adolescents. Journal of Adolescent Health.
 Tynes, B. M., Del Toro, J., & Lozada, F. (2015). An unwelcomed digital visitor in the classroom: The longitudinal impact of online racial discrimination on school achievement motivation. School Psychology Review, 44(4), 407–424.
 Tynes, B.M. & Lozada, F. (2017). Longitudinal effects of online experiences on empathy among African American adolescents. Journal of Applied Developmental Psychology, 52, 181–190.

References 

Living people
Year of birth missing (living people)
American women psychologists
21st-century American psychologists
Columbia College (New York) alumni
Northwestern University alumni
University of California, Los Angeles alumni
University of Southern California faculty
American women academics
21st-century American women